The Domino Trail is a shared used path running from Trentham, Victoria to Lyonville, 75km northwest of Melbourne. The trail mostly follows part of the route of the former Carlsruhe to Daylesford railway line  part of which is still running as the Daylesford Spa Country Railway . The trail has been primarily developed for walkers, but is usable by mountain bikes.

References
http://www.railtrails.org.au/component/railtrails/?view=trail&id=166&Itemid=66
 

Rail trails in Victoria (Australia)